Year 630 (DCXXX) was a common year starting on Monday (link will display the full calendar) of the Julian calendar. The denomination 630 for this year has been used since the early medieval period, when the Anno Domini calendar era became the prevalent method in Europe for naming years.

Events 
 By place 
 Byzantine Empire 
 March 21 – Emperor Heraclius returns the True Cross, one of the holiest Christian relics, to Jerusalem. He tries to promote Monothelitism, which is rejected by the Christians.
 Heraclius issues a decree that all Jews must become Christian; a massacre follows around Jerusalem and in Galilee (Israel), some survivors fleeing to the Daraa area.
 Chorpan Tarkhan, general of the Khazars, invades and devastates Roman Armenia. He defeats a Persian cavalry force (10,000 men) sent by Shahrbaraz to repel the invasion.

Central America
October 1 – Tajoom Ukʼab Kʼahkʼ, the ruler of the Mayan city state of Calakmul in southern Mexico dies after a reign of eight years and is succeeded by Cauac, who reigns until 636.

 Scandinavia 
 Yngling King Olof Trätälja founds a colony in Värmland. He is expelled from his native Västergötland (in modern-day Sweden) (according to the Ynglingatal).

 Britain 
 King Ricberht of East Anglia dies and is succeeded by Sigeberht, who returns from exile in France. He rules together with his kinsman Ecgric, re-establishing Christianity. 
 King Penda of Mercia besieges Exeter in southwest England. King Cadwallon ap Cadfan of Gwynedd lands with a force nearby, and negotiates an alliance with Penda.
 Eanswith, daughter of King Eadbald of Kent, founds the Benedictine Folkestone Priory, the first nunnery in England.

 Persia 
 April 27 – King Ardashir III, age 9, is murdered after an 18 month reign. He is succeeded by Shahrbaraz who becomes ruler (shah) of the Sasanian Empire.
 June 9 – Shahrbaraz is killed and succeeded by Borandukht, daughter of former king Khosrow II. She ascends the throne as 26th monarch of Persia.

 Arabia 
 January – Battle of Hunayn: Muhammad defeats the Bedouin tribe of Hawazin (12,000 men) in a valley, on one of the roads leading to Ta'if (Western Arabia). 
 February 5 – Siege of Ta'if: Muhammad begins to besiege Ta'if and brings battering rams and catapults to suppress the fortress city, but is unable to penetrate it.
 December 11 – Conquest of Mecca: A Muslim army (10,000 men) marches on Mecca, which surrenders. Muhammad takes the city from the Quraysh and makes it the spiritual center of Islam.

 Asia 
 Illig Qaghan, ruler (khagan) of the Eastern Turkic Khaganate, is captured by Li Jing during the Tang campaign against the Eastern Turks.

 By topic 
 Religion 
 Xuanzang, Chinese Buddhist monk (bhikkhu), travels across the Gobi Desert to Kumul. Following the Tian Shan mountain range of Central Asia westwards, he arrives in Turpan.

Births 
 November 7 – Constans II, Byzantine emperor (d. 668)
 Alhfrith, king of Deira (approximate date)
 Conon I, pope of the Catholic Church (approximate date)
 Di Renjie, chancellor of the Tang Dynasty (d. 700)
 Fausta, Byzantine empress (approximate date)
 Nukata, Japanese poet (approximate date)
 Reineldis, Frankisch saint (approximate date)
 Sigebert III, king of Austrasia (approximate date)

Deaths 
 April 27 – Ardashir III, king of the Persian Empire
 June 9 – Shahrbaraz, king of the Persian Empire
 Du Ruhui, chancellor of the Tang Dynasty (b. 585)
 Ricberht, king of East Anglia (approximate date)

References

Sources